Goran Marković (Serbian Cyrillic: Горан Марковић; 2 February 1986 – 13 October 2019) was a Serbian professional footballer.

Club career
After playing in a number of local clubs in his birth-town area, in 2006 he moved to Belgrade's second tier club FK Obilić where after only one season his skills were noted earning him a contract with a Serbian Superliga club FK Čukarički. After two seasons with Čukarički, in 2009 he moved to HŠK Zrinjski Mostar playing in the Premier League of Bosnia and Herzegovina. Next summer, 2010, he signed with another Bosnian top league club, Sarajevo's Željezničar.

Death
On 13 October 2019, Marković died after falling from the fifth floor of an apartment building while repairing a window.

Honors

Željezničar
 Bosnia and Herzegovina Football Cup (1): 2010–11
 Premier League of Bosnia and Herzegovina (1): 2011–12

References

External links
 Profile and stats at Srbijafudbal

1986 births
2019 deaths
Sportspeople from Pančevo
Serbian footballers
Serbian expatriate footballers
FK Dinamo Pančevo players
FK Obilić players
FK Čukarički players
Serbian SuperLiga players
FK Radnik Bijeljina players
HŠK Zrinjski Mostar players
FK Željezničar Sarajevo players
Premier League of Bosnia and Herzegovina players
Expatriate footballers in Bosnia and Herzegovina
Association football defenders
Accidental deaths from falls
Accidental deaths in Serbia